The Battle of Belach Lechta or Bealach Leachta was a major battle fought in Munster in 978 between Máel Muad mac Brain, King of Munster, and Brian Bóruma. In the battle, the king was killed and Bóruma took over the role as the de facto King of Munster. Bóruma was the younger brother of Mathgamain mac Cennétig and in line to be the next High King of Ireland.

Notes

References

 
 Journal of the Cork Historical and Archaeological Society, Vol. IV, 2nd Series, 1898, via Harvard College 21 October 1919 Library
 O'Brien, John and John Conry, Dublin Annals of Inisfallen (18th century compilation based on older sources) (see O'Donovan for translation)
 O'Donovan, John (ed. & tr.), Annala Rioghachta Eireann. Annals of the Kingdom of Ireland by the Four Masters. 7 vols. Dublin: Royal Irish Academy. 1848–51. 2nd edition, 1856. Volume II, pp. 704–5
 O'Mahony, John, "A History of the O'Mahony septs of Kinelmeky and Ivagha", in Journal of the Cork Historical and Archaeological Society, Volumes 12–16, Second Series. 1906–1910.
 Ó Murchadha, Diarmuid, "Cenn Ebrat, Sliab Caín, Belach Ebrat, Belach Legtha/Lechta", in Éigse 29 (1996): 153–71.
 Todd, James Henthorn (ed. & tr.), Cogadh Gaedhel re Gallaibh: The War of the Gaedhil with the Gaill. London: Longmans. 1867.

Belach
Belach
O'Brien dynasty
978
10th century in Ireland